Masoud Rayegan (also Romanized as "Mas’ūd Rāyegān"; born January 21, 1954, in Khoramabad, Iran) is an Iranian actor and writer. He was nominated for the Crystal Simorgh Best Actor award at the 23rd Fajr International Film Festival for his performance in the film So Close, So Far.

Filmography
So Close, So Far 
Santouri
Predicament
The Searchers (TV series)
The Recall (TV series)
Golchehreh
In the Strand of Zayandeh Rud (TV series)
Nafas (TV series)

References

External links
Iranian Movie Database

1954 births
Living people
Audiobook narrators
Iranian male actors
People from Khorramabad
Iranian male film actors
Iranian male television actors
21st-century Iranian male actors